The 1952 NCAA basketball tournament involved 16 schools playing in single-elimination play to determine the national champion of men's  NCAA Division I college basketball. The 14th annual edition of the tournament began on March 21, 1952, and ended with the championship game on March 26 in Seattle. A total of 20 games were played, including a third place game in each region and a national third place game.

Kansas, coached by Phog Allen, won the national title with an 80–63 victory in the final game over St. John's, coached by Frank McGuire. Clyde Lovellette of Kansas was named the tournament's Most Outstanding Player.

This tournament was the first to have a true "Final Four" format, with the winners at four regional sites advancing to the final site—although the four regionals did not receive distinct names until the 1956 tournament. It was also the first to have regional television coverage.

Locations
The following are the sites selected to host each round of the 1952 tournament:

Regionals

March 21 and 22
East-1 Regional, Reynolds Coliseum, Raleigh, North Carolina (North Carolina State University)
East-2 Regional, Chicago Stadium, Chicago, Illinois (Loyola University/University of Illinois-Chicago)
West-1 Regional, Municipal Auditorium, Kansas City, Missouri (University of Missouri-Kansas City)
West-2 Regional, Oregon State Coliseum, Corvallis, Oregon (Oregon State University)

Final Four

March 25 and 26
Hec Edmundson Pavilion, Seattle, Washington (Seattle University/University of Washington)

Seattle and Hec Edmundson Pavilion became the first hosts of the true Final Four; prior to this, the national semifinal games were hosted at the regional sites. It also made them the third host city and venue, after New York's Madison Square Garden and the Kansas City Municipal Auditorium, to host the National Championship multiple times. For the second year in a row, Reynolds Coliseum served as a host venue to the tournament, hosting one of the two East regionals. The Municipal Auditorium also continued its streak of hosting games, hosting one of the West regionals. The arena had been used in every tournament except the first up to this point. For the second time, the tournament returned to the Chicago area, this time hosting games at Chicago Stadium, one of the largest arenas in the country at the time. And for the first time, the tournament came to the state of Oregon, with West regional games played at the Oregon State Coliseum on the campus of then-Oregon State College.

Teams

Bracket

National Third Place Game

Regional third place games

See also
 1952 National Invitation Tournament
 1952 NAIA Basketball Tournament

References

NCAA Division I men's basketball tournament
Ncaa
NCAA  Basketball Tournament
NCAA basketball tournament